The following is a comprehensive discography of Slint, an American math rock band which formed in 1986. The band has released two studio albums and one EP.

This list does not include material performed by members or former members of Slint that was recorded with The Breeders, Evergreen, The For Carnation, King Kong, Will Oldham, Squirrel Bait, Tortoise, or Zwan.

Studio albums

Extended plays

Box sets

Compilations

Appearances

Other songs
"King's Approach", created around 1994, is a ten-minute instrumental that was played live during the band's 2007 reunion concerts. An official recording of the song was never released.

A song known as "Snoopy" was played live by the band in 1990.

References

External links
 
 

Discographies of American artists
Rock music group discographies